Volcanic eruptions can be highly explosive. Some volcanoes have undergone catastrophic eruptions, killing large numbers of humans or other life forms. This list documents volcanic eruptions by human death toll.

Volcanic eruptions

See also
Lists of disasters
List of volcanic eruption deaths
List of natural disasters by death toll
List of volcanic eruptions in the 21st century

References

 
Volcanic
Death toll